Hopewell is an unincorporated community in Jefferson County, Alabama, United States. Today it lies mostly within the corporate limits of the City of Bessemer. The historic Sadler Cemetery lies nearby which contain the graves of many pioneer settlers of western Jefferson County.

References

Unincorporated communities in Jefferson County, Alabama
Unincorporated communities in Alabama